Odontocarya perforata is a species of plant in the family Menispermaceae. It is endemic to Ecuador.

References

Menispermaceae
Endemic flora of Ecuador
Critically endangered plants
Taxonomy articles created by Polbot
Plants described in 1977